The 2011 Aktobe bombing was a terrorist attack in the city of Aktobe, Kazakhstan on 17 May 2011. The attacker entered the headquarters of the National Security Committee in the region and set off a suicide bomb, killing himself and injuring two others. Initially, the bombing was blamed on "organized crime" in what was considered the first mafia-related suicide bombing in history. Some newspapers said that , the bomber, was a member of an organized criminal group. However, Kazakhstani officials eventually conceded that the attack was probably linked to Islamic extremists in the oil-rich province. The attack marked the opening of a violent summer in Kazakhstan's west, during which multiple attacks claimed the lives of a combined 19 people.

See also
Terrorism and counterterrorism in Kazakhstan

References

2011 crimes in Kazakhstan
2011 Aktobe bombing
Islamic terrorism in Kazakhstan
Islamic terrorist incidents in 2011
May 2011 crimes
May 2011 events in Asia
Suicide bombings in 2011
Suicide bombings in Kazakhstan
Terrorist incidents in Kazakhstan in 2011